Mamudu Kamaradin is a Ghanaian professional footballer who plays as a defender for Ghana Premier League side Karela United FC on loan from Obuasi Ashanti Gold.

Club career 
Kamaradin moved to Ashanti Gold S.C. in 2020. He was signed by Karela United on a year long loan deal for the 2020–21 Ghana Premier League season.

International career 
In August 2020, Kamaradin received a call up into the Black Satellites the Ghana national under-20 football team for the team's camping WAFU U-20 qualifiers.

References

External links 

 

Living people
Association football defenders
Ghanaian footballers
Ashanti Gold SC players
Karela United FC players
Year of birth missing (living people)